German submarine U-1305 was a Type VIIC/41 U-boat of Nazi Germany's Kriegsmarine during World War II.

She was ordered on 1 August 1942, and was laid down on 30 July 1943, at Flensburger Schiffbau-Gesellschaft, Flensburg, as yard number 498. She was launched on 11 July 1944, and commissioned under the command of Oberleutnant zur See Helmuth Christiansen on 13 September 1944.

Design
German Type VIIC/41 submarines were preceded by the heavier Type VIIC submarines. U-1305 had a displacement of  when at the surface and  while submerged. She had two shafts and two  propellers.

U-1305 was fitted with five  torpedo tubes (four fitted at the bow and one at the stern), fourteen torpedoes, one  SK C/35 naval gun, (220 rounds), one  Flak M42 and two  C/30 anti-aircraft guns. The boat had a complement of between forty-four and fifty-two.

Service history
On 10 May 1945, U-1305 surrendered at Loch Eriboll, Scotland. She was later transferred to Lisahally on 14 May 1945.

Post war service
The TNC allocated U-1305 to the Soviet Union. On 4 December 1945, she arrived in Libau, Latvia, as British N-class N25. On 13 February 1946, the Soviet Navy allocated her to the Baltic Fleet. She was renamed S-84 on 9 June 1949, then sent to the reserve fleet on 30 December 1955. S-84 went to the Northern Fleet as a test hulk and was later sunk in the Barents Sea on 10 October 1957, during an atomic bomb test off of Novaya Zemlya.

Summary of raiding history

See also
 Battle of the Atlantic

References

Bibliography

German Type VIIC/41 submarines
U-boats commissioned in 1944
World War II submarines of Germany
1944 ships
Ships built in Flensburg
Maritime incidents in October 1957